Francis Edward McLean (1863 – 4 April 1926) was an Australian politician. Born in Sydney, he received a primary education before becoming a clerk, and eventually an accountant and businessman. In 1894 he was elected to the New South Wales Legislative Assembly as the member for Marrickville, a member of the Free Trade Party. He held the seat until 1901, when he transferred to federal Parliament, winning the House of Representatives seat of Lang, again for the Free Trade Party. In 1903, he unsuccessfully attempted to defeat prominent Protectionist and former Premier of New South Wales William Lyne in his seat of Hume. He retired from politics and died in 1926.

References

 

Free Trade Party members of the Parliament of Australia
Members of the Australian House of Representatives for Lang
Members of the Australian House of Representatives
Members of the New South Wales Legislative Assembly
1863 births
1926 deaths
20th-century Australian politicians